The Schizophrenia International Research Society is an academic organization with a global scope, devoted to the study of schizophrenia and related disorders.

See also
 Schizophrenia Bulletin

External links
 
 The Schizophrenia Forum

Schizophrenia-related organizations
Mental health organizations in Tennessee